Oscar Francisco Razo Ventura (born 9 April 1984) is a Mexican former professional football defender who last played for Club Atlas in the Liga MX. He previously played for CD Veracruz, and made 16 appearances for them in 2006–07. He retired on 1 January 2015.

References

1984 births
Living people
People from Irapuato
Footballers from Guanajuato
Mexican footballers
Irapuato F.C. footballers
Pachuca Juniors footballers
C.D. Veracruz footballers
Chiapas F.C. footballers
Atlético Morelia players
Association football defenders